Cornelius Harvey McGillicuddy (born August 12, 1967), popularly known as Connie Mack IV, is an American politician and lobbyist. A Republican, he ran for the U.S. Senate in 2012, losing to Democrat Bill Nelson. He is the son of former Republican U.S. Senator Connie Mack III and the great-grandson of baseball manager Connie Mack.

Early life, education, and family
Mack was born in Fort Myers, Florida, the son of cancer prevention advocate Ludie Priscilla (née Hobbs) and former U.S. Senator Connie Mack III. His father represented the district from 1983 to 1989 (when it was numbered as the 13th District), before serving two terms in the U.S. Senate.

Through his father, Mack is the great-grandson of Connie Mack, the manager and owner of baseball's Philadelphia Athletics and member of the Baseball Hall of Fame; the great-grandson of Morris Sheppard, U.S. Senator and Representative from Texas; and the great-great-grandson of John Levi Sheppard, a U.S. Representative from Texas.

In June 1988, Mack earned his Associate of Arts from Santa Fe Community College and In 1993, Mack earned his Bachelor of Arts from the University of Florida. After college, Mack became a marketing executive, working as a consultant to promote the restaurant chain Hooters.

Florida House of Representatives
In 2000, incumbent Republican State Representative Debby Sanderson decided to retire to run for a seat in the Florida Senate. Mack decided to run for the open seat in the Fort Lauderdale–based 91st House District. He defeated Democratic nominee Kevin Rader 56%–44%. In 2002, he won re-election with 79% of the vote.

Mack was Chairman of the Committee on State Administration, and in his second term he became the Deputy Majority Leader.

U.S. House of Representatives

Elections
In 2003, incumbent Republican Congressman Porter Goss announced his intention to retire in order to serve as Director of the CIA. That October, Mack resigned from the Florida Legislature and moved back to his hometown of Fort Myers to run for his father's old seat. Had he not resigned his state house seat, he would have been unable to vote for himself in the primary or general election in the 14th District, as the Florida Constitution requires state legislators to be residents of the district they represent. Mack stated, "The people of the 14th District deserve to be represented in Washington by someone who shares our mainstream conservative Republican values in the mold of my father and Congressman Porter Goss". He narrowly won a four-way Republican primary—the real contest in this heavily Republican district—with a plurality of 36% of the vote, defeating more experienced challengers State Representative Carole Green and Lee County Commissioner Andy Coy. He won the general election with 68% of the vote.

Mack consistently won re-election without serious difficulty, with his closest bid in 2008, when he won 59% in a three-way election.

Tenure
Mack is a vocal supporter of cutting federal spending and lower taxes. He is a signer of the Taxpayer Protection Pledge. Additionally, he is a co-sponsor of a constitutional amendment to require a balanced federal budget and was one of the most outspoken opponents of federal bailouts. Mack has also been a prominent advocate for greater congressional oversight of government surveillance. He voted against George W. Bush's domestic eavesdropping program in 2006 and Foreign Intelligence Surveillance Act Reform in 2007.

Mack was an outspoken critic of late Venezuelan President Hugo Chávez, as well as one of the most vocal opponents of the Latin American television network teleSUR. He is also a member of the Congressional Cuba Democracy Caucus. As a member of the Transportation and Infrastructure Committee, Mack helped secure over $81 million to expand Interstate 75 in Southwest Florida, a project of significant concern to the region.

Unlike many members of Congress, Mack has been a vigorous and outspoken defender of the whistle-blowing website WikiLeaks.

Committee assignments
 Committee on Foreign Affairs
 Subcommittee on the Middle East and South Asia
 Subcommittee on the Western Hemisphere (Chairman)
 Committee on Oversight and Government Reform
 Subcommittee on Federal Workforce, U.S. Postal Service and Labor Policy
 Subcommittee on Government Organization, Efficiency and Financial Management (Vice Chair)
 Subcommittee on Regulatory Affairs, Stimulus Oversight and Government Spending

2012 U.S. Senate election

Early in the election cycle, Mack was considered a potential candidate against incumbent Democratic Senator Bill Nelson in the 2012 Senate election. However, he declined to run on March 25, 2011, citing family and his work in the House of Representatives. On October 26, 2011, it was announced Mack had changed his mind and that he would seek the Republican nomination because he felt no one in the current field was able to defeat Nelson. His opponent in the primary was former Representative Dave Weldon, whom Mack defeated, winning 58% of the vote. Mack then lost to Nelson by over one million votes.

Electoral history

|-
| colspan="10" style="text-align:center;" | U.S. House, 14th District of Florida (General Election)
|-
!Year
!Winning candidate
!Party
!Pct
!Opponent
!Party
!Pct
!Opponent
!Party
!Pct
|-
|2004
| |Connie Mack IV
| |Republican
| |68%
| |Robert M. Neeld
| |Democratic
| |32%
|
|
|
|-
|2006
| |Connie Mack IV (inc.)
| |Republican
| |64%
| |Robert M. Neeld
| |Democratic
| |36%
|
|
|
|-
|2008
| |Connie Mack IV (inc.)
| |Republican
| |59%
| |Robert M. Neeld
| |Democratic
| |25%
| |Burt Saunders
| |Independent
| |15%
|-
|2010
| |Connie Mack IV (inc.)
| |Republican
| |69%
| |James L. Roach
| |Democratic
| |27%
| |William M. St. Claire
| |Independent
| |4%

Post-congressional career
In 2013, Mack was hired as a partner at lobbying firm Liberty Partners Group, where his father was a chairman emeritus. Following his unsuccessful bid for the Senate, Mack founded two lobbying and consulting firms, Mack Strategies and Liberty International Group. In March 2014, he registered to become a lobbyist for American Task Force Argentina. As of September 2014, he was an executive vice president of public relations firm Levick as well as a registered lobbyist for Levick, Doral Financial and Las Vegas Sands. Mack considered entering Florida's 19th congressional district special election in 2014 to replace Trey Radel but, in January 2014, officially declined to enter the race.

International lobbying 
Mack has also worked extensively as a lobbyist for the government of Hungary. In December 2020, Mack joined Platinum Advisors DC to lobby in support of increased humanitarian assistance to Ethiopia.

Personal life
In 1992, Mack was involved in a bar fight with professional baseball player Ron Gant in Georgia. Mack suffered a broken ankle in the fight but a jury ultimately found that Gant was not liable for Mack's injuries.

Mack and Ann Galluzzo were married in 1996 and divorced in 2006. They have a son named Connie Mack V and daughter named Addison Mack.

In 2007, while representing his Florida district in the U.S. House of Representatives, Mack married then-U.S. Representative from California Mary Bono (R-CA), former wife of Glenn Baxley and widow of Sonny Bono. They were the third married couple to serve in the House of Representatives simultaneously. Mack and Bono divorced in 2013. He married Jennifer Key, an international development expert, in 2018. They have a son named William Arthur McGillicuddy.

References

External links
 
 
 

|-

1967 births
21st-century American politicians
Living people
Mack, Connie IV
Republican Party members of the Florida House of Representatives
Republican Party members of the United States House of Representatives from Florida
Spouses of California politicians
University of Florida alumni
Members of Congress who became lobbyists